Gene Taylor (born November 12, 1962) is a former professional American football wide receiver. He was drafted by the New England Patriots in the sixth round of the 1987 NFL Draft. He played college football at Fresno State.

Professional career

New England Patriots
Taylor was selected by the New England Patriots in the sixth round (163rd overall) of the 1987 NFL Draft.

Tampa Bay Buccaneers
Taylor played two season with the Tampa Bay Buccaneers (1987–88).

San Francisco 49ers
Taylor signed with the San Francisco 49ers for the 1989 season but did not play a single down.

Saskatchewan Roughriders
Taylor played for the Saskatchewan Roughriders of the Canadian Football League in 1989.

Los Angeles Rams
Taylor signed with the Los Angeles Rams in 1990. He was waived on August 16.

Barcelona Dragons
Taylor signed with the World League of American Football in 1991. He was selected by the Barcelona Dragons in the first round (second wide receiver) of the 1991 WLAF positional draft. He was one of the WLAF's top ten pass receivers.

New England Patriots
Taylor was signed by the New England Patriots on July 9, 1991. He was released on August 26.  The Patriots re-signed him on November 12. He was waived on December 6.

References

1962 births
Living people
American football wide receivers
Fresno State Bulldogs football players
Tampa Bay Buccaneers players
New England Patriots players
Barcelona Dragons players
Players of American football from Oakland, California
Saskatchewan Roughriders players